Rathgeber is a surname of German origin. Notable people with the surname include:

Alex Rathgeber (born 1982), Australian actor, and singer
Brent Rathgeber (born 1964), Canadian lawyer, author, and politician
Thomas Rathgeber (born 1985), German soccer player
Valentin Rathgeber (1682–1750), German composer, organist, and choirmaster

References

Surnames of German origin